Tim Edey is an English multi-instrumentalist and composer who grew up in Broadstairs, Kent and is now based in Perthshire, Scotland. In 2012 he was Musician of the Year at the BBC Radio 2 Folk Awards and, with Brendan Power, Best Duo. He was awarded "Musician of the Year" in the 2020 MG Alba Scots Trad Music Awards.

Edey has been described as an "instrumental genius". As well as singing, he plays guitars, melodeon, piano and tin whistle. Wriggle and Writhe, his collaboration  with New Zealand harmonica player Brendan Power, was, according to Colin Irwin, who reviewed it for the BBC, "one of the more colourful folk albums of 2011, from a pair of true virtuosos".

Edey toured with The Chieftains on their 2014 tour of the United States, their 2017 tour of Japan and was also a member of Lúnasa.

Discography

Albums
 2006	 Irish Music From The Dingle Peninsula And Beyond
 2010 	Disgrace Notes  (with Séamus Begley) 
 2010  The Collective		
 2011 	Wriggle and Writhe (with Brendan Power) 		
 2012 	Sailing Over The 7th String
 2016	 How Do You Know?
 2017	 The Sleeping Tunes
 2018  The Sleeping Tunes, Vol. 2
 2019  Being Myself
 2020  The Sleeping Tunes, Vol. 3 : Lockdown Edition

Singles
 1999 A Suite for Celts in Kent''

References

External links
Official website

Living people
English folk guitarists
English male guitarists
English multi-instrumentalists
Lúnasa (band) members
People from Broadstairs
Year of birth missing (living people)